Abraham de Sola (September 18, 1825 – June 5, 1882) was a Canadian rabbi, author, Orientalist, and academic. Originating from a large renowned family of rabbis and scholars, De Sola was recognized as one of the foremost leaders of Orthodox Judaism in North America during the latter half of the nineteenth century.

Early life and education
Born in London, England, the sixth child of David Aaron de Sola and Rebecca Meldola. His maternal grandfather was ḥakham Raphael Meldola, a prominent English rabbi. His sister Eliza married Rabbi Abraham Pereira Mendes and was the mother of Rabbis Frederick de Sola Mendes and Henry Pereira Mendes.

In 1846, De Sola was elected minister of the Congregation Shearith Israel of Montreal, where he arrived in early 1847. De Sola was appointed lecturer (1848) and then professor (1853) of Hebrew and Oriental literature at McGill University, and eventually became the senior professor of its Faculty of Arts. He was president of the Natural History Society for several years, and addressed its members frequently on academic subjects. The degree of LL.D. was conferred upon him by McGill in 1858—the first instance of a Jew attaining this honour in an English-speaking country.

Later career

In 1873, by invitation of President Ulysses S. Grant's administration, De Sola delivered the opening prayer for the United States Congress. The event was of significance, as De Sola was a British subject, and this was the first indication of a more friendly feeling between the United States and Great Britain after the dangerously strained relations that had been caused by the recently adjusted Alabama Claims. William Ewart Gladstone, then British Prime Minister, as well as Sir Edward Thornton, the British ambassador at Washington, extended the thanks of the British government to De Sola.

Abraham de Sola frequently visited the United States, and, through his pulpit addresses and numerous contributions to the press, became recognized there as one of the most powerful leaders of Orthodox Judaism, at a time of heightened tension between the Orthodox and Reform wings of the community. He was intimately associated with Isaac Leeser, Samuel Myer Isaacs, Bernhard Illowy, J. J. Lyons, and other traditionalist religious leaders, and on Leeser's death was invited to become successor to his pulpit; but this and many similar offers he declined. For twenty years he was a constant contributor to Leeser's Occident, and after the latter's death he purchased the copyrights and stereotype plates of his works and continued their publication.

He died in New York City in 1882 and was buried in Montreal. His archives are held at McGill University.

Personal life
De Sola married Esther Joseph on 30 June 1852.

Publications
Besides the below works, Abraham de Sola also contributed actively to the Jewish press, a large number of articles by him appearing in The Voice of Jacob, The Asmonean, The British-American Journal, and other contemporary Jewish journals. His articles on Sir John William Dawson's Archaia, Dawn of Life, and Origin of the World are specially noteworthy. He also edited and republished George Bethune English's Grounds of Christianity and a number of educational works.

Selected works

  
 
 
 
 
  With Rev. Jacques J. Lyons.

References

External links
 
 
 Abraham de Sola and Evelyn Miller fonds at the McGill University Archives.

1825 births
1882 deaths
19th-century Sephardi Jews
Canadian Orthodox rabbis
British emigrants to Canada
Jewish Canadian writers
Sephardi rabbis
Spanish and Portuguese Jews
Academic staff of McGill University
Writers from Montreal
Anglophone Quebec people
19th-century Canadian Jews